Carmilla is a Gothic novella by Joseph Sheridan Le Fanu.

Carmilla may also refer to:

Comics 
 Scorpion (Carmilla Black), Marvel Comics character
 Carmilla Frost, minor Marvel Comics character
 "Carmilla", 1991 Aircel Comics miniseries by Steven Jones and John Ross

Film 
 Carmilla (film), a 2019 British film
 The Carmilla Movie, a 2017 Canadian film based on the web series

Music 
 "Carmilla", a single by Australian singer Jon English
 "Carmilla", a single by Japanese vocalist Kaya
 "Carmilla", a song by Italian band Theatres des Vampires, from Moonlight Waltz

Video games 
 Carmilla, a character in Castlevania
 Carmilla, a character in Vampire Hunter D
 Carmilla, an Assassin-class Servant appearing in Fate/Grand Order based on the eponymous character in Le Fanu's work

Other uses 
 Carmilla (web series), a Canadian web series based on the novella
 Carmilla (Re:Zero), a character in the light novel series Re:Zero − Starting Life in Another World 
 "Carmilla", episode of the 1989 TV series Nightmare Classics

See also 
 Carmila, Queensland
 Camilla (disambiguation)